is a railway station in the city of Yamagata, Yamagata Prefecture, Japan, operated by East Japan Railway Company (JR East).

Lines
Zaō Station is served by the Ōu Main Line, and is located 81.8 rail kilometers from the terminus of the line at Fukushima Station.

Station layout
Zaō Station has two opposed side platforms connected via a footbridge. The station is staffed.

Platforms

History
It was renamed Zaō Station on 1 March 1951. The station was absorbed into the JR East network upon the privatization of JNR on 1 April 1987.

Passenger statistics
In fiscal 2018, the station was used by an average of 1105 passengers daily (boarding passengers only). The passenger figures for previous years are as shown below.

Surrounding area

 Tohoku Bunkyō College
 Tokai University Yamagata Senior High School

See also
List of railway stations in Japan

References

External links

 JR East Station information 

Stations of East Japan Railway Company
Railway stations in Yamagata Prefecture
Ōu Main Line
Railway stations in Japan opened in 1911
Yamagata, Yamagata